Czarnolas may refer to:

 Czarnolas, Lipsko County, Masovian Voivodeship, east-central Poland
 Czarnolas, Opole Voivodeship, south-west Poland
 Czarnolas, West Pomeranian Voivodeship, north-west Poland
 Czarnolas, Zwoleń County, Masovian Voivodeship, east-central Poland

See also
 Czarnolas-Kolonia,  Zwoleń County, Masovian Voivodeship, east-central Poland